Lynch House may refer to:

in the United Kingdom
 Lynch House (Bedfordshire), Kensworth, a Grade II* listed building in Bedfordshire

in the United States
(by state, then city)

 Thomas Lynch House, Morning Star, Arkansas, listed on the National Register of Historic Places
 Timothy J. Lynch House, Maywood, Illinois, listed on the National Register of Historic Places
 Lynch-O'Gorman House, Brookline, Massachusetts
 James A. Lynch House, Manchester, Michigan, a Michigan State Historic Site
 James Lynch House, Nutten Hook, New York
 Matthew J. and Florence Lynch House and Garden, Portland, Oregon
 Victoria Hall (Pittsburgh), Pennsylvania, formerly known as Lynch House
 Matthew Lynch House, Providence, Rhode Island
 Fairfield Plantation (Charleston County, South Carolina), also known as Lynch House
 Lynch's Brickyard House, Lynchburg, Virginia